Letzelter is a French surname. Notable people with the surname include:

 Jean-Claude Letzelter (born 1940), French chess master
 Johan Letzelter (born 1984), French footballer

French-language surnames